Palladin is a protein that in humans is encoded by the PALLD gene. Palladin is a component of actin-containing microfilaments that control cell shape, adhesion, and contraction.

Discovery 

Palladin was characterised independently by two research groups, first in the lab of Carol Otey (in 2000) and then in the lab of Olli Carpén (in 2001). It is a part of the myotilin-myopalladin-palladin family and may play an important role in modulating the actin cytoskeleton. Palladin, in contrast to myotilin and myopalladin, which are expressed only in striated muscle, is expressed ubiquitously in cells of mesenchymal origin.

Palladin was named after the Italian Renaissance architect Andrea Palladio, reflecting its localization to architectural elements of the cell.

Isoforms
In humans, it appears that seven different isoforms exist, some of which arise through alternative splicing.  In mice, three major isoforms of palladin arise from a single gene.  These isoforms contain between three and five copies (depending on the isoform) of an Ig-like domain and between one and two copies of a polyproline domain.

Function 

Palladin's precise biological role is poorly understood, but it has been shown to play a role in cytoskeletal organization, embryonic development, cell motility, scar formation in the skin, and nerve cell development.

Disease linkage 

Recently, it has been demonstrated that palladin RNA is overexpressed in patients with pancreatic neoplasia, and that palladin is both overexpressed and mutated in an inherited form of pancreatic cancer. The palladin mutation identified in familial pancreatic cancer may be unique to a single North American family, as this same mutation has not been found in any other European or North American populations, respectively, in two other genetic studies.

Further, Salaria et al. have shown that palladin is overexpressed in the non-neoplastic stroma of pancreatic cancer, but only rarely in the cancer cells per se, suggesting that palladin's role in this disease may involve changes in the tumor microenvironmment.  More research is clearly required before this protein and its role in neoplasia can be fully understood.

Disease-causing mutations have also been identified in the two other members of this gene family.  Myotilin mutations cause a form of limb-girdle muscular dystrophy, and mutations in myopalladin cause an inherited form of heart disease (dilated cardiomyopathy).

Interactions 

PALLD has been shown to interact with EZR.

References

Further reading

External links